Buffalo Creek is a stream in northeastern Ripley County in southeastern Missouri. It is a tributary of the Current River.

The stream was named for either buffalo in the area or the buffalo fish in the creek.

See also
List of rivers of Missouri

References

Rivers of Ripley County, Missouri
Rivers of Missouri